United High School may refer to:

Unity School District (Wisconsin) in Balsam Lake, Wisconsin
Unity High School (Sudan) in Khartoum, Sudan
Unity High School (Oakland, California) 
Unity High School (Mendon, Illinois) 
Unity High School (Tolono, Illinois) 
Unity High School (Duluth, Minnesota)
Unity High School at the Door in Manhattan, New York, New York